Roygos Ridge (‘Rid Roygos’ \'rid 'roy-gos\) is a mostly ice-covered ridge extending 9.6 km in a southeast-northwest direction, 3.2 km wide and rising to 1247 m on the east coast of Darbel Bay, Loubet Coast in Graham Land, Antarctica.  It has rounded top and steep, partly ice-free north and south slopes, and surmounts Erskine Glacier to the south and Cardell Glacier to the north.

The ridge is named after the Thracian King Roygos (3rd century BC).

Location
British mapping in 1976.

Maps
 Antarctic Digital Database (ADD). Scale 1:250000 topographic map of Antarctica. Scientific Committee on Antarctic Research (SCAR). Since 1993, regularly upgraded and updated.
British Antarctic Territory. Scale 1:200000 topographic map. DOS 610 Series, Sheet W 66 64. Directorate of Overseas Surveys, Tolworth, UK, 1976.

Notes

References
 Bulgarian Antarctic Gazetteer. Antarctic Place-names Commission. (details in Bulgarian, basic data in English)
 Roygos Ridge. SCAR Composite Antarctic Gazetteer.

External links
 Roygos Ridge. Copernix satellite image

Ridges of Graham Land
Bulgaria and the Antarctic
Loubet Coast